The Riotts. (ライオット, stylized as the Riotts.) was a Japanese visual kei rock band who officially formed in November 2009, but first started activities in May as a session band called Milky Way (みるきーうぇい). The three official members; Setsuki, Tara, and Kasumi, use various "guest" musicians.

History 
In March 2009 176BIZ disbanded, in May a session band called Milky Way was formed by former members Setsuki (ex-Karen), Tara (ex-Panic Channel) and Kasumi (ex-Gimmick). They played their first live on July 10 at the Takada no Baba Area. In November they became an official band, known as The Riotts. Their official homepage was opened on November 21, 2009. Currently The Riotts. have no official vocalist, but used Mike (Blu-Billion) as a guest vocalist until the release of their first mini-album, StarInvitation.

Members

Current members
 Sechi (formerly called Setsuki [雪希]) - guitar
 Tara (たら) - bass
 Kasumi (楓栖) - drums
 Ayumu (歩) - guest vocals

Former guest members
 Buu (ぶう) - vocals (Ensoku)
 Tetsu - guitar (ex-Gimmick)
 Mike (ミケ) - vocals (Blu-Billion)

Discography

Albums
 Riot Star (2011.01.26)

Mini-Albums
 StarInvitation (2010.01.15)
 Hoshi Renge (星蓮花; "Lotus Flower Star", 2010.10.06)

Singles
 "Stargazer" (スターゲイザー, 2010.05.26)

References

External links
 Official Website
 Visunavi
 Tara´s blog
 Sechi´s blog
 Kasumi´s blog

Japanese pop rock music groups
Visual kei musical groups
Japanese rock music groups